The 2019 Piala Presiden was the 35th season of the Piala Presiden since its establishment in 1985. The league is currently the youth level (U21) football league in Malaysia. Terengganu III are the defending champions. 22 teams competed in this season. All teams were drawn into two different groups, and plays in a maximum of 22 home-and-away matches. Top four teams after the completion of group stage matches progressed to knockout stage.

Teams
The following teams were participating in the 2019 Piala Presiden. 

Group A
 Armed Forces U21
 Johor Darul Ta'zim III
 Kedah U21
 Pahang U21
 PJ City U21
 Pulau Pinang U21
 Sabah U21
 Selangor U21
 Selangor United U21
 UiTM U21
 Perlis U21

Group B
 AMD U17
 Felda United U21
 Kelantan U21
 Kuala Lumpur U21
 Melaka U21
 Negeri Sembilan U21
 Perak U21
 PDRM U21
 PKNP U21
 PKNS U21
 Sarawak U21
 Terengganu III

League table

Group A

Group B

Result table

Group A

Group B

Knock-out stage

Bracket

See also
 2019 Piala Belia

References

External links
 Football Association of Malaysia
 SPMB 

 
2019 in Malaysian football